Jean Kurt Forest (2 April 19093 March 1975) was a German violinist and violist, Kapellmeister and composer. He began his career as concertmaster in film orchestras conducted by Paul Dessau, then played principal viola in Frankfurt and Hamburg. Drafted to the Wehrmacht in 1942, he defected to the Red Army in 1945 and remained a prisoner of war until 1948. Back in East Berlin, he shaped musical life in the GDR in several positions, before he focused on composition from 1954, composing political songs and operas raising social awareness.

Life 
Born Jean Kurt Forst in Darmstadt, the son of a paperhanger, he learned to play the violin at the age of four. From age six, he received a thorough and varied musical education at the Spangenberg Conservatory in Wiesbaden, studying violin, voice, piano, trumpet, timpani and harmony until 1925. He mostly taught himself to play the viola and to compose.

He worked as concert master in Wiesbaden for the UFA film orchestra in 1926, and in the same position for the  cinema in Berlin from 1927 to 1930, collaborating in both locations with conductor Paul Dessau. From 1930 to 1933, he played principal viola for the Rundfunksinfonieorchester Frankfurt, and in the same role for the Philharmonisches Staatsorchester Hamburg and the Hamburg State Opera from 1934 to 1936. In 1937 he was arrested by the Nazis because of his anti-fascism attitude. Dismissed from all positions, he emigrated to Paris, but was expelled back to Germany in 1938. He worked as Kapellmeister at the Stadttheater Neiße, and from 1939 at the Staatstheater Braunschweig.

In 1942, Forest was drafted to the Wehrmacht, but in 1945 defected to the Red Army. When he returned to Germany, he settled in East Berlin and joined the Socialist Unity Party of Germany (SED). He participated in Berlin in various functions in the development of musical life in the German Democratic Republic (GDR), first as a consultant for choral music at the Berliner Rundfunk to 1951, and as Kapellmeister for Deutscher Fernsehfunk from 1952. He was a freelance composer from 1954.

In 1970 he was admitted to the Akademie der Künste der DDR (DAK). From 1969 until his death, he directed the chamber ensemble Musica Nova.

Work 
Forest composed around 250 songs, several of the genre Massenlied. His opera Der arme Konrad, written between 1955 and 1957 after a play by Friedrich Wolf, was followed in 1960 by the chamber opera Tai Yang erwacht, also after Wolf. In his stage works, Forest focused on historic topics, pointing at social conscience, such as fascism, war and the atomic bomb.

Filmography 
Forest wrote film scores for several films, including:
 1958: Der Prozeß wird vertagt
 1961: 
 1962:  (television film)
 1962: Schaut auf diese Stadt
 1964: 
 1964: 
 1967:

Awards 
Among Forest's awards were:
 1956:  of Bezirk Potsdam
 1959: Art Prize of the German Democratic Republic
 1965: National Prize of the German Democratic Republic third class for art and literature
 1965:  in Gold
 1968:  of the Free German Trade Union Federation
 1969: Patriotic Order of Merit in Silver

Further reading 
 Forest, Jean Kurt. In Minister of Intra-German Relations (ed.): SBZ-Biographie. Ein biographisches Nachschlagebuch über die sowjetische Besatzungszone, Zusammengestellt vom . Deutscher Bundes-Verlag, Bonn 1964, .
 Hans-Joachim Kynaß: Jean Kurt Forest / Kurzbiographie und ausgewählte Werke, in association with the Music Council of the GDR. Association of German Composers and Musicologists, Musikinformationszentrum, Berlin 1967.

References

External links 
 
 
 Georg Plathe: Interview (interview, in German) in: Siegfried Trzoß: Schlagergeschichte(n) des Ostens, vol. 1. 1945–1965, Berlin 2007
 Jean-Kurt-Forest-Archiv Archives of the Academy of Arts, Berlin
 Forest, Jean Kurt Verlag Neue Musik

1909 births
1975 deaths
Musicians from Darmstadt
20th-century classical composers
German composers
Recipients of the Patriotic Order of Merit in silver
Socialist Unity Party of Germany members